Raychel Crystal Proudie (born May 26, 1983) is an American politician who is a member of the Missouri House of Representatives from the 73rd district in St. Louis County.

Career
Proudie was elected unopposed on 6 November 2018 from the platform of the Democratic Party. She won the nomination in the Democratic primary on 7 August 2018, prevailing with 57% of the vote in a 3-way contest.

Electoral History

References

1983 births
21st-century American politicians
21st-century American women politicians
Living people
Proudie, Raychel
Women state legislators in Missouri